Guttormson is a surname. Notable people with the surname include:

Elman Guttormson (1929–2000), Canadian politician
Rick Guttormson (born 1977), American baseball player